(born June 8, 1976 in Osaka Prefecture, Japan) is a retired Japanese male freestyle swimmer. He represented Japan at the 1996 Summer Olympics in Atlanta, Georgia. He is best known for winning a gold and a bronze medal at the 1995 Summer Universiade in Fukuoka.

References
 

1976 births
Living people
Olympic swimmers of Japan
Swimmers at the 1996 Summer Olympics
Sportspeople from Osaka Prefecture
Japanese male freestyle swimmers
Universiade medalists in swimming
Universiade gold medalists for Japan
Universiade bronze medalists for Japan
Medalists at the 1995 Summer Universiade
Medalists at the 1997 Summer Universiade
20th-century Japanese people